Space Janitors was a Canadian web series. The show is a parody of the Star Wars franchise and the plot is focused on two janitors, Darby & Mike, on a space station. It is available through the series producer Shaftesbury Plus on YouTube.

Characters
Starring Brendan Halloran, Scott Ryan Yamamura, and Pat Thornton, Space Janitors centers around Social Group 417:
 Darby Richards (Brendan Halloran), a human custodian
 Dennis 4862 (Scott Ryan Yamamura) a human clone squall trooper
 Mike Chet (Pat Thornton), a human custodian
 Edith Kingpin (Evany Rosen), a computer psychologist first class
 Officer Emily Roarke (Helen Johns)
 LN6-K aka Elle (Tess Degenstein), an engineer second class
 Marf (Andy Hull)

Production
The series was created by Davin Lengyel and Geoff Lapaire, digital media producers who were previously associated with the web and television series Pure Pwnage. It premiered in 2012.

Season 3 was partially funded as a Kickstarter project. The third season also received a theatrical screening at Toronto's Royal Cinema on January 9, 2015.

Awards
The series is the recipient of a number of awards and nominations. Notably, they won Best Web Series at the Canadian Comedy Awards in 2013 and Best Original Program or Series, Fiction at the 2nd Canadian Screen Awards in 2014.

 Canadian Comedy Awards, 2013 (Internet / Best Web Series) – Winner
 Cast & Crew Nominations: Best Direction, Best Male Performance, Best Ensemble Performance
 1st Canadian Screen Awards, 2013 (Original Program or Series, Fiction) – Nominated
 2nd Canadian Screen Awards, 2014 (Original Program or Series, Fiction) – Winner
 4th Canadian Screen Awards, 2016 (Original Program or Series, Fiction) – Nominated

Episodes

 101 — Space Janitors Have Dreams Too
 102 — Android Puke and Squall Trooper Training
 103 — Light-Based Arm Cutter Instrument
 104 — The Dark Lord: 53% Machine, Total Badass
 105 — Fire Giant Laser
 106 — Accidentally the Dark Lord
 107 — Rebels Seem Like Nice Guys
 108 — I'm a Fish?
 201 — Escape to Desert Planet
 202 — Holoroom
 203 — Life Debt
 204 — Wormhole
 205 — Pyus Dunes
 206 — Bounty Hunter
 207 — Fish Planet, Part 1
 208 — Fish Planet, Part 2
 301 — Echoing Base
 302 — Probe Droid
 303 — Brain Wormed
 304 — Haunted Heroes
 305 — Hope Day
 306 — Diplomacy
 307 — Showdown, Part 1
 308 — Showdown, Part 2

References

External links
 Space Janitors at Geek & Sundry
 

Canadian comedy web series
Canadian science fiction web series
2012 web series debuts
2015 web series endings